Ella Holm Bull, (12 October 1929 – 21 September 2006) was a Southern Sámi teacher and author, dedicated to promoting the Southern Sami language for many years. Together with Knut Bergsland, she created an orthography for Southern Sámi in 1974, which is called the Bergsland-Bull orthography in their honor. Holm Bull received numerous awards for her work on Southern Sámi, including the first-ever Gollegiella Award in 2004.

Works

Literary
 Manne joe maahtam lohkedh. 1989 
 Åarjel-saemien Gåalmede gærja. 1987 
 Åarjel-saemien Vijhtede gærja. 1986 
 Åarjel-saemien Nubpie gærja. 1986 
 Åarjel-saemien Nealjede gærja. 1986 
 Ovmese veareldh. 1985 
 Suhtjegh. 1984 
 Tsååbpe-niejlen jih Tsååbpe-baernien bijre. 1984 
 Brorke. 1984 
 Åarjel-saemien Voestes gærja. 1982 
 Lohkede Saemien (with Knut Bergsland). 1974

Musical
She published two LPs on the Iđut label:
 Jåvle-Laavlomh (1996). . (Christmas songs)
 Laavlomh-Maanide (1997). . (Children's songs, recorded with assistance from Frode Fjellheim)

Awards
 The first Nordic Sámi Language Prize, Gollegiella in 2004. 
 The first Nord-Trøndelag County Culture Award in 1982. 
 The Saami Council's Annual Prize in 1996
 Translator's Award for Children's and Young Adult Literature from the Norwegian Ministry of Culture and Church Affairs in 1976 for her translation of the picture book Jakob og Joakim to Southern Sámi.

References 

1929 births
2006 deaths
Norwegian Sámi people
Norwegian Sámi-language writers
Norwegian Sámi musicians
Sámi orthography
Southern Sámi